Arthur Davies  (10 January 1886 – November 1949) was a Welsh international footballer. He was part of the Wales national football team between 1904 and 1905, playing two matches. He played his first match on 12 March 1904 and his second on 6 March 1905, both against Scotland.

Career
Davies began his playing career with Wrexham St. Giles before signing as a Professional for Wrexham. Following his spell at Wrexham he moved to local rivals Druids, where he achieved one cap for Wales.

In June 1904, he joined West Bromwich Albion where he twice had the opportunity to play alongside his brother Llewellyn. In January 1905, after 12 appearances for West Bromwich Albion, Arthur was sent to Middlesbrough, where he played a few games before returning to Wales.

He played for local Amateur teams Wrexham Nomads and Ruabon before retiring.

Later career
He later became club secretary at Druids before becoming a director at Wrexham.

At the time of his death he lived at Croesnewydd Hall Farm, and was a partner in a building firm.

Death
Davies' body was found in the River Dee at Overton in November 1949. The inquest into his death found that he had drowned, but returned an open verdict after learning of recent business problems he had been having.

See also
 List of Wales international footballers (alphabetical)

References

1886 births
1949 deaths
Welsh footballers
Wales international footballers
West Bromwich Albion F.C. players
Wrexham A.F.C. players
Place of birth missing
Association football midfielders
Druids F.C. players
Footballers from Wrexham
Deaths by drowning in the United Kingdom